Western Maori was one of New Zealand's four original parliamentary Māori electorates established in 1868, along with Northern Maori, Eastern Maori and Southern Maori. In 1996, with the introduction of MMP, the Maori electorates were updated, and Western Maori was replaced with the Te Tai Hauāuru and Te Puku O Te Whenua electorates.

Tribal areas
The Western Maori electorate extended from South Auckland and the Waikato to Taranaki and the Manawatu. The seat originally went to Wellington. With MMP it was replaced by the Te Tai Hauāuru and Te Puku O Te Whenua electorates in 1996.

The electorate included the following tribal areas:
Tainui, Taranaki

History
The first member of parliament for Western Maori from 1868 was Mete Kīngi Paetahi. At the nomination meeting in Wanganui, held at the Courthouse, Paetahi was the only candidate proposed. He was thus elected unopposed. He represented the electorate of Western Maori from 1868 to 1870. He contested the electorate again at the 1871 general election, but of the three candidates, he came last. He was defeated by Wiremu Parata, with Te Keepa Te Rangihiwinui in second place.

In the  there was some doubt about the validity of the election result, and a law was passed to confirm the result in Western Maori and two other electorates.

From the 1890s to the 1930s the seat was held by various Reform Party MPs. In 1935, Toko Ratana the eldest son of the founder of the Ratana Church won the seat and became the second Ratana MP; he became a Labour MP following the Labour-Ratana pact. From this point until the abolition of the seat prior to the 1996 election the seat was held by Labour MPs.

Toko Ratana died in 1944 and was succeeded by his younger brother, Matiu Rātana. He died in 1949 shortly before the 1949 general election. His wife Iriaka Rātana stood in his stead, despite significant opposition from those supporting traditional leadership roles, with Te Puea Herangi speaking out against her claim to "captain the Tainui canoe". Only the strong backing of the  Rātana church and her threat to stand as a Rātana Independent secured her the Labour Party nomination. She became the first woman Maori MP, getting a similar majority (6317) to her husband in 1946 (his majority then was 6491), but no less than seven independent candidates  (and one Kauhananui candidate, K Nutana) stood against her; they got 116 to 326 votes each.

Candidates for the National Party (who usually came second) included Hoeroa Marumaru (1946, 1949 & 1951) and Pei Te Hurinui Jones (1957, 1960 and 1963; also earlier).

Members of Parliament
Western Maori was represented by 15 Members of Parliament:

Key

Election results
Note that the affiliation of many early candidates is not known. There is contradictory information about the affiliation of Henare Kaihau. In Wilson's New Zealand Parliamentary Record, 1840–1984, the authoritative work covering parliamentary history, Kaihau is listed as a Reform Party supporter from the party's inception in 1908. Kaihau does, however, appear on a poster of the Liberal Party in 1910. The New Zealand Herald, in its  reporting, also lists him as a government supporter, i.e. a Liberal.

Three newspapers, The Marlborough Express, The New Zealand Herald, and the Auckland Star reported political affiliations. Two papers have Māui Pōmare as an independent, whilst the third has him as a Labour supporter. Henare Kaihau is given three different affiliations: independent, Liberal, and Reform. Pepene Eketone is categorised as Labour by two of the papers, whilst the third has him as a Liberal supporter. The Auckland Star lists another Labour supporter, but the name is a composite of first and last names of two of the candidates.

1871 election

1876 election

1879 election

1881 election

1884 election

1886 by-election

1887 election

1890 election

1893 election

1896 election

1899 election

1902 election

1905 election

1908 election

1911 election

1914 election

1930 by-election

1931 election

1945 by-election

Notes

References

Historical Māori electorates
1996 disestablishments in New Zealand
1868 establishments in New Zealand